Capitolio is a Caracas Metro station on Line 1. It was opened on 2 January 1983 as part of the inaugural section of Line 1 between Propatria and La Hoyada. The station is between Caño Amarillo and La Hoyada. It is a transfer station, connected with Line 2 via El Silencio.

The name of the station originates from the Capitolio Federal which is located nearby.

References 

Caracas Metro stations
1983 establishments in Venezuela
Railway stations opened in 1983